Emilio Cruz Roldán (born 24 January 1951) is a Spanish businessman and former football manager.

Career
Born in Madrid, Cruz started his career at Tomelloso CF in 1986 before moving to Atlético Madrid two years later. Initially a manager of the reserves, he was named Javier Clemente's assistant in 1990.

In January 1990 Cruz was appointed manager of La Liga side Rayo Vallecano, but suffered relegation after achieving only three wins out of 18 matches. After a two-year spell at CD Toledo he returned to Atleti, being appointed manager of the first team on 11 November 1993.

Cruz was replaced by José Luis Romero after eight games in charge, which included only one win. He was subsequently in charge of Getafe CF, Toledo, Levante UD, CD Ourense and Cádiz CF, never being able to complete a season; his reign with the Valencians only lasted five games, with his side failing to obtain a single point.

Cruz subsequently retired from football, focusing solely on his company which was making the security of the Vicente Calderón Stadium during his time as a manager.

References

External links
 
 

1951 births
Living people
Footballers from Madrid
Spanish footballers
Association football midfielders
Girona FC players
SD Huesca footballers
CP Cacereño players
Spanish football managers
La Liga managers
Segunda División managers
Atlético Madrid B managers
Rayo Vallecano managers
Atlético Madrid managers
Getafe CF managers
CD Toledo managers
Levante UD managers
Cádiz CF managers